Barbara Lee Niven (née Bucholz; born February 26, 1953) is an American actress, writer and producer, best known for her performances in Hallmark and Lifetime movies, and for television roles in Pensacola: Wings of Gold, One Life to Live, Cedar Cove, and Chesapeake Shores. Niven had the leading role in the independent film A Perfect Ending (2012). She is also a motivational speaker, media trainer and animal rights activist, and a National Ambassador for American Humane.

Early life
Barbara Lee Bucholz was born in 1953 in Portland, Oregon, to parents George and Edie Bucholz. She has two sisters, Shelley and Kim, and attended David Douglas High School. She has stated that she knew when she was five that she wanted to be an actress. She grew up hunting and fishing and was a senior in high school before she got involved in acting.

After high school, she attended college for six months, worked as export coordinator for a foundry, a general contractor, sold commercial real estate, and modelled. She married at twenty-one and had a business with her husband. Niven became a mother at twenty-six.  After a divorce, and with no child support, she found a place to live with roommates to help with expenses.
 
Her ten-year high school reunion committee mailed a questionnaire, with the final inquiry being, "have you achieved everything in your life that you thought you would by now?" The realization that she had not started acting made Niven declare to herself that she was "going to be an actor" and "going to be in show business somehow." Acknowledging a penchant for being on camera and knowing that she enjoyed writing, she decided to look for a job in news reporting.

Career

Getting started
Niven went to see the news director at KGW in Portland and asked to make sample stories for him to critique. She promised to ‘pay it forward’ if she had a successful career. He agreed and provided a typical script. She was later hired as an intern, and her story about the White House Easter Egg Roll made the network news.

She spent hours reading from the theater section of Powell's Books and memorized a monologue from Neil Simon's Chapter Two. In the early 1980s, there was a nationwide search to replace the character Tina Lord on One Life to Live. One audition was held in Seattle. Niven drove in freezing rain from Portland, taped the monologue, and drove back home without telling anyone what she had done. She was one of several people chosen to go to New York for a screen test.

In New York she was told by Mari Lyn Henry, then ABC casting director, that she did not have star quality and her voice would only lead to victims' roles. She went back to Portland determined to work on her voice and her craft. She got a retired radio man to be her voice coach. She was cast in Hallmark Hall of Fame’s 1986 Promise, which filmed in Oregon. She received her SAG card on this movie. When her daughter was ten, she packed their belongings into a truck and trailer and moved to Los Angeles.

Television and film
For twelve years, she attended the master classes of Milton Katselas at the Beverly Hills Playhouse. Between 1986 and 1993 she was billed as Barbara Lee Alexander, and as Barbara Lee Niven for the film Lone Tiger (1994).see Filmography She is known for her roles on soap operas The Bold and the Beautiful as Brenda Dickerson, and in One Life to Live as Liz Coleman Reynolds.

She served for three years on the National Board of Directors for the Screen Actors Guild. From March 20 - September 8, 1989, she was hostess and announcer, with host Michael Burger, for the syndicated game show, Straight to the Heart. In 2000, served as a celebrity blue-team contestant for St. Thomas on Search Party.

Niven starred on the syndicated drama series Pensacola: Wings of Gold (1998-2000). Niven also has appeared in guest roles on numerous television series, including ER, Cold Case, Las Vegas, NCIS, Charmed, Eli Stone, and Parks and Recreation. Additionally, she had multiple roles on Silk Stalkings, and a recurring role on Pacific Palisades.

She played Marilyn Monroe in the HBO film The Rat Pack (1998) and has appeared in many films such as Under Lock and Key (1995), Forest Warrior (1996), Foxfire (1996), Breast Men (1997), The Drone Virus (2004), Chasing Ghosts (2005), Redline (2007) and Summer's Blood (2009). She had the leading role in A Perfect Ending (2012) and co-starred with Kat Dennings and Ray Wise in the horror comedy Suburban Gothic (2014).

Niven has also appeared in over a dozen Lifetime movies, including Stranger in My Bed (2005), The Perfect Neighbor (2005), Double Cross (2006), Murder in My House (2006), The Rival (2006), A Valentine Carol (2007), Black Widow (2008), Dead at 17 (2008), Accused at 17 (2009), Heat Wave (2009), My Mother's Secret (2012), Home Invasion (2012), The Wife He Met Online (2012), and Disney Channel's Tiger Cruise (2004).

She has multiple credits for Hallmark, starting with her first role in Hallmark Hall of Fame's Promise (1986), with James Garner and James Woods. Among other appearances, there are A Carol Christmas (2003), Wedding Daze (2004), Back to You and Me (2005), Mystery Woman: Wild West Mystery (2006), McBride: Semper Fi (2007), and Moonlight & Mistletoe (2008). In 2013, Niven was cast in Hallmark Channel's first original drama series Cedar Cove, opposite Andie MacDowell and Bruce Boxleitner. Niven is currently appearing in the series Chesapeake Shores with Treat Williams and Diane Ladd. For Hallmark Movies & Mysteries, she has been cast in the Murder, She Baked and Crossword Mysteries movies.

Speaker and coach
Barbara Niven has made motivational speeches and said that if she could become an actor as a single mother at thirty, others can also fulfill their dreams. She has spoken to school classes, professional groups, and on television shows. The subjects have included: "Giving up Perfect to Claim Your Dreams", "Paralyzed to Powerful" (tips to save yourself from a stalker), "Eating Disorders & Pressures to be Perfect", and "The Pressure to be Thin in Hollywood".

She has done media training for individuals and corporations. Niven has a studio and developed workshops to educate people to make a positive impression with speaking, presentation, and media video. Her instructions include: for presentations, consciously create a character with voice, use good lighting, and connect heart to heart; and when performing, build relationships, be a personal producer and the welcoming person in the room. She says, "the older one gets the more beautiful tools and instruments you have to add to your orchestra and your palette".

She has described her writing process as do anything but write, clean the desk, then write from the heart and let the words flow.

Personal life
Niven has been married three times, to Ronald Garrison ( 1974, divorced), David Alexander ( 1985, divorced), and David Niven Jr. ( June 19, 1993,  1998). She has a daughter, Jessica, and three grandchildren. She obtained dual Canadian citizenship because her father was born there. Her favorite color is red, although she likes to wear black. She prefers sweats to fancy dresses.

For thirty years, between fifteen and forty-five, she suffered from bulimia. Her older sister asked about it, and she got help after her daughter fainted at cheerleading practice. Others on the squad were also bulimic/anorexic. Niven promptly got them both help. She says, "secrets are what kept me sick." Once the secret was out, it no longer controlled her. Eating disorders is a topic about which she gives presentations that garner positive feedback.

She supports human rights causes and programs that speak out against bullying. Niven appeared in She4ME ('She' for Marriage Equality), the 2014 five-minute public service video created in support. She has been a proponent of the 2012 seventeen-minute anti-bullying short Love is All You Need?, and its purpose in asking viewers to see themselves as a minority.

Niven is an animal rights activist and spokesperson. She has a four-legged family of dogs and cats at home, and fosters older pets. She has participated on an animal rescue team to save victims of a puppy mill, and is a National Ambassador for American Humane.

Filmography

a as Barbara Lee Alexander     n as Barbara Lee Niven

Theatre

Video games

Books

Author
 Niven, Barbara (2011). 111 Star Power Tips – Insider Secrets from a Hollywood Pro : For Videos, Audios, On-Camera Interviews, TV, Radio & Presentations. Shadoeworks. .

Contributor
 Niven, Barbara (2006). "Barbara Niven [actor]". In Stromberg, Gary; Merrill, Jane. Feeding the Fame : Celebrities Tell Their Real-Life Stories of Eating Disorders. Hazelden. pp. 96–107. .
 Niven, Barbara (2009). "ACT AS IF!". In Kingsbury, Gail (ed.). How Did You Do That! Stories of Going for It. Yinspire Media. pp. 99–104. .
 Niven, Barbara (2011). "Shine Your Light", In Lim, Kimber (ed.). Get Your Woman On! Embracing Beauty, Grace & the Power of Women. Yinspire Media. pp. 41–46. .
 Niven, Barbara (2013). "A Perfect Ending...and a New Beginning", In Mayfield, Karen (ed.). Wake Up Women Be You : Spread Your Wings and Fly Emotionally. Wake Up Women. pp. 32–39. .
 Niven, Barbara (2015). "Success, Goosebumps & Your Next Evolution". In Allen, Debbie (ed.). Experts Wisdom : Life Changing Principles and Transformational Business Strategies from the Go-To Authorities. Authentic Endeavors Publishing. pp. 203–218. .
 Niven, Barbara (2016). "Taking a Leap of Faith, Dreams, Money, & Show Biz" In Giankas, Patricia (ed.). Great Credit Now : Set Your GPS for Positive Success. Authentic Endeavors Publishing. pp. 105–116. .

References

Sources

Additional reading
 Markel, Adam (2016). Pivot : The Art and Science of Reinventing Your Career and Life. Atria Books. [see index]. .

External links

 Official website
 
 
 
 
 
 
 
 Barbara Niven: Actor, Media Trainer, Motivational Speaker - a resource page

1953 births
Living people
20th-century American actresses
21st-century American actresses
Actresses from Portland, Oregon
American film actresses
American soap opera actresses
American television actresses
American video game actresses
David Douglas High School alumni